Clelia Murphy (born 5 December 1975) is an Irish actress. From 1996 to 2017, Murphy starred in the RTÉ soap opera Fair City as Niamh Cassidy. After leaving her role as Niamh, she competed in the third series of the Irish edition of Dancing with the Stars, where she reached the quarter finals. In January 2022, Murphy was cast in the BBC soap opera Doctors as Maeve Ludlow, for which she moved from Dublin to Birmingham.

Early and personal life
Murphy trained at the Gaiety School of Acting in Dublin, Ireland. She also has an MA in screenwriting. In 1998, Murphy gave birth to a daughter, Clarabelle. Clarabelle is an actress.

Career
Murphy began her career in Fair City in 1996 playing schoolgirl Niamh Cassidy. Her character was featured in numerous storylines, involving having an illegal relationship with teacher Barry O'Hanlon (Pat Nolan), her tumultuous relationship with her husband, Paul Brennan (Tony Tormey), having an affair and eventually leaving her husband with his money.  In 2017, after 22 years on the soap, Murphy announced her decision to leave Fair City. She revealed that she had been thinking about the decision since 2015 and eventually finalised her plans when she felt she was no longer learning anything from the experience. She added: "I felt like I was doing the same thing over and over again. It wasn’t fulfilling me anymore." She will play Maeve Ludlow, the practice nurse at Sutton Vale, which the Mill Health Centre has recently taken over. 

In January 2019, Murphy appeared on the third series of the Irish edition of Dancing with the Stars. Murphy was paired with Estonian dancer Vitali Kozmin in the competition. They reached the quarter finals of the competition before being eliminated after falling into the dance-off for the third consecutive week. In 2021, she appeared in an episode of the Channel 5 series The Madame Blanc Mysteries, which she described as an "amazing experience". In February 2022, it was announced that Murphy had been cast in the BBC soap opera Doctors as nurse Maeve Ludlow. She had begun filming on Doctors in January of that year after receiving a direct offer from the casting team. She moved to Birmingham, England to appear in the soap.

Filmography

Film

Television

Stage

References

External links
 

1975 births
Actresses from Birmingham, West Midlands
Actresses from Dublin (city)
Irish film actresses
Irish soap opera actresses
Irish television actresses
Living people